Arnela Zeković (born 1993) is a Serbian model, influencer and beauty pageant titleholder.

Pageants

Miss Bikini International
Arnela competed and represented Croatia at the Miss Bikini International and placed in the Top 12.She was 7 in the world.  Even if she is a Serb, the Serbs sent her to represent Croatia.

Miss Serbia 2013
Arnela placed as 1st Runner-Up in Miss Serbia 2013 pageant which was held at RTV Pink Studio in Belgrade.
In the preparations for Miss Serbia, which was organized in Greece, Arnela won the first place as Miss Porto Caras

References

https://www.telegraf.rs/amp/jetset/840227-arnela-zekovic-je-miss-porto-karasa-foto

External links
Serbije Queen website

Living people
1993 births
Serbian beauty pageant winners
Serbian female models
People from Prijepolje